"Private Number" is a song recorded by the pop band The Jets. It features on their 1985 debut album, The Jets and was released as the third single from the album in 1986.

Music video

The music video for "Private Number" opens with someone dialing a telephone number in a phone booth. The Jets are then seen singing in an alley, and in front of an empty phone booth. At the end of the video, a piece of paper tumbles by, with a phone number written on it: 612-420-3226. For some time after this video was released, fans could call the "private number" and listen to pre-recorded messages from members of the Jets; lucky callers could even speak live to members.

Chart performance

External links

1985 songs
1986 singles
The Jets (band) songs
MCA Records singles
Songs written by Aaron Zigman
Songs written by Jerry Knight